This is a list of the historic "Big Houses"  of County Carlow, Ireland. The term is a direct translation from Irish and refers to the country houses, mansions or estate houses of the historical landed class in Ireland.

This page lists 87 of the most prominent historic big houses in Carlow, which have adequate records associated with them. While many of these houses are currently in private ownership, they are still afforded varying degrees of protection by the Irish government based on whether their architecture or history is considered nationally, regionally or locally important.

At the height of the estates period in the 1800s, Carlow had a greater number of country houses and demesnes per hectare than any other rural county in Ireland. These "big houses" and their occupants dominated the economic and political landscape until the turn of the 20th century. Historian Jimmy O'Toole likens the prevalence of estates within the county to Gloucestershire, England, stating that Carlow was "the most gentrified county in Ireland".

The majority of these houses are listed within the National Inventory of Architectural Heritage (NIAH) and most of the remainder are registered as historic buildings by Carlow County Council. A small number of these houses are not currently listed on any register. This is usually due to significant alteration or demolition prior to the foundation of the NIAH in 1990.

Gallery

Big Houses of County Carlow

See also
Destruction of Irish country houses (1919–1923)
Irish National Land League
List of historic houses in the Republic of Ireland
Plantations of Ireland
Protestant Ascendancy

References

Bibliography
 O'Toole, Jimmy: The landed gentry in decline – A County Carlow perspective.

Houses in Ireland
Social history of Ireland

National Monuments